The men's 10 metre air pistol competition at the 2004 Summer Olympics was held on 14 August at the Markópoulo Olympic Shooting Centre near Athens, Greece.

The event consisted of two rounds: a qualifier and a final. In the qualifier, each shooter fired 60 shots with an air pistol at 10 metres distance. Scores for each shot were in increments of 1, with a maximum score of 10.

The top 8 shooters in the qualifying round moved on to the final round. There, they fired an additional 10 shots. These shots scored in increments of 0.1, with a maximum score of 10.9. The total score from all 70 shots was used to determine final ranking.

2002 World champion Mikhail Nestruyev of Russia had attained a score of 591 to break a new Olympic record in the qualification round, until Chinese shooter and six-time Olympian Wang Yifu caught him up on the last shot to grab his second Olympic gold (the first being done in Barcelona 1992) in the event by an immensely thin 0.2-point margin, finishing with a total of 690.0 to 689.8. Nestruyev's countryman Vladimir Isakov, on the other hand, took the bronze medal with 684.3, edging out 1988 champion Tanyu Kiryakov of Bulgaria by almost a single point.

France's Franck Dumoulin, who eluded Wang for an Olympic gold in Sydney 2000, failed to reach the final round after slipping off from his title defense to share a twentieth place tie with four other shooters in the prelims.

Records
Prior to this competition, the existing world and Olympic records were as follows.

Qualification round 

OR Olympic record – Q Qualified for final

Final

References

External links
Official Results

Men's 10 m Air Pistol
Men's events at the 2004 Summer Olympics